Campeaux is the name of two communes in France:

Campeaux, Calvados 
Campeaux, Oise